The celiac artery (also spelled coeliac), also known as the celiac trunk or truncus coeliacus, is the first major branch of the abdominal aorta. It is about 1.25 cm in length. Branching from the aorta at thoracic vertebra 12 (T12) in humans, it is one of three anterior/ midline branches of the abdominal aorta (the others are the superior and inferior mesenteric arteries).

Structure
The celiac artery is the first major branch of the descending abdominal aorta, branching at a 90° angle. This occurs just below the crus of the diaphragm. This is around the first lumbar vertebra.

There are three main divisions of the celiac artery, and each in turn has its own named branches:

The celiac artery may also give rise to the inferior phrenic arteries.

Function
The celiac artery supplies oxygenated blood to the liver, stomach, abdominal esophagus, spleen, and the superior half of both the duodenum and the pancreas. These structures correspond to the embryonic foregut. (Similarly, the superior mesenteric artery and inferior mesenteric artery feed structures arising from the embryonic midgut and hindgut respectively. Note that these three anterior branches of the abdominal aorta are distinct and cannot substitute for one another, although there are limited connections between their terminal branches.)

The celiac artery is an essential source of blood, since the interconnections with the other major arteries of the gut are not sufficient to sustain adequate perfusion. Thus it cannot be safely ligated in a living person, and obstruction of the celiac artery will lead to necrosis of the structures it supplies.

Drainage
The celiac artery is the only major artery that nourishes the abdominal digestive organs that does not have a similarly named vein.

Most blood returning from the digestive organs (including from the area of distribution of the celiac artery) is diverted to the liver via the portal venous system for further processing and detoxification in the liver before returning to the systemic circulation via the hepatic veins.

In contrast to the drainage of midgut and hindgut structures by the superior mesenteric vein and inferior mesenteric vein respectively, venous return from the celiac artery is through either the splenic vein emptying into the hepatic portal vein or via smaller tributaries of the portal venous system.

Clinical significance 
Aneurysms in the celiac artery account for around 4% of visceral artery aneurysms. This may cause abdominal pain.

The celiac artery is vulnerable to compression from the crus of the diaphragm during ventilation where it originates from the abdominal aorta. This is known as median arcuate ligament syndrome. This may present no symptoms, but can cause pain due to restricted blood flow to the superior mesenteric artery.

Additional images

See also
 Celiac artery compression syndrome

Reference

External links

  - "Branches of the celiac trunk."
  - "Parietal and visceral branches of the abdominal aorta."
 
 

Arteries of the abdomen